The 1902 Minnesota Golden Gophers football team represented the University of Minnesota in the 1902 Western Conference football season. In their third year under head coach Henry L. Williams, the Golden Gophers compiled a 9–2–1 record (3–1 against Western Conference opponents), finished in third place in the conference, shut out nine of their twelve opponents, and outscored all opponents by a combined total of 335 to 34. The Gophers' 102 points against  on November 1, was the largest point total to that date in the program's history and the first time a Minnesota team scored 100 or more points.

Schedule

References

Minnesota
Minnesota Golden Gophers football seasons
Minnesota Golden Gophers football